Carl Gustav Wilhelm Tham (born 5 July 1939) is a Swedish politician. Until 1984, he was a member of Liberal People's Party, and since 1986, he is a Social Democrat.

He was Party secretary in the Liberal People's Party from 1969 to 1978. He was Minister for Energy from 1978 to 1979 and member of the Riksdag (parliament) in 1976 and from 1979 to 1980. Then he became Director-general of the State Energy Agency (Statens energiverk), a position he held from 1983 to 1985 and of the Swedish International Development Cooperation Agency from 1985 to 1994. He became Education Minister in 1994 and served in that capacity until 1998. Between 2002 and 2006, he was the Swedish Ambassador in Berlin. Tham is the only person in modern times who has served in a right/centre government as well as a Social Democratic Government.

References

1939 births
Living people
Politicians from Stockholm
Swedish Social Democratic Party politicians
Members of the Riksdag from the Liberals (Sweden)
Swedish Ministers for Education
Ambassadors of Sweden to Germany